The Canadian Screen Award for Best Live Action Short Drama is awarded by the Academy of Canadian Cinema and Television to the best Canadian live action short film. Formerly part of the Genie Awards, since 2012 it has been presented as part of the Canadian Screen Awards.

In the 1980s and 1990s, the award was not always presented at every Genie Award ceremony. In years when the award was not presented, a single award was instead presented for Best Theatrical Short Film, inclusive of both animated and live-action shorts.

1980s

1990s

2000s

2010s

2020s

See also
Prix Iris for Best Live Action Short Film

References

 
Live Action Short Drama